Dennis Joseph Murphy (born 8 January 1932) is a retired major general in the United States Marine Corps who served as commander of the 2nd Marine Division from 1984 until his retirement in 1987. He graduated from Georgetown University in 1953 where he played for the Georgetown Hoyas basketball team.

References

1932 births
Living people
United States Marine Corps generals
Military personnel from New York City
Georgetown Hoyas men's basketball players